Captain Judith Keene is a former Commandant of Cadets at the United States Coast Guard Academy. She was the 31st to hold the position and the first woman to ever do so. During her tenure, Keene had to deal with a court martial in which cadets testified that sexual assault issues at the academy were not taken seriously.

References

Female United States Coast Guard personnel
Living people
Year of birth missing (living people)
Sexual assault in the United States military
21st-century American women